The Prince and the Pauper (German: Prinz und Bettelknabe) is a 1920 Austrian silent adventure film directed by Alexander Korda and starring Tibor Lubinszky, Albert Schreiber, and Adolf Weisse. It is based on Mark Twain's 1881 novel The Prince and the Pauper about a poor boy who switches places with Edward, Prince of Wales in Tudor England.

For the first time in this Austrian film, a child actor, the Hungarian Tibor Lubinszky, who at eleven years old could already boast a respectable career in cinema, was called to play the double role of protagonist.

Production
The film's producer Alexander Kolowrat wanted to emulate the spectacle of Italian costume epics, and was particularly inspired by two recent German films, Madame Dubarry (1919) and Anna Boleyn (1920) by Ernst Lubitsch. It was Korda's first film after leaving his native Hungary and moving to Austria to work for Sascha-Film. He collaborated with the screenwriter Lajos Bíró, who had also been forced to leave Hungary, for the first time. They would later work on twenty three more films together.

Reception
The film was largely praised on its release in Britain. Albert Schreiber's portrayal of Henry VIII was particularly praised for avoiding the buffoonery usually associated with the monarch. The critical reception was also favourable in Austria, Germany and the United States. The film's American release was delayed due to a legal dispute with an American company which was also planning a film version of the novel. Once it was eventually released it proved to be a great success.

The film's financial success in America inspired Korda towards his later ambitions to make "international films" which would have global market appeal, a strategy he put into place when working later in Britain which led to the worldwide success of his 1933 film The Private Life of Henry VIII.

Cast
 Tibor Lubinszky as Prince Edward/Tom Canty 
 Albert Schreiber as Henry VIII 
 Adolf Weisse as Lord Chancellor  
 Franz Herterich as John Canty 
 Franz Everth as Miles Herndon 
 Wilhelm Schmidt as Hugh Herndon 
 Ditta Ninjan as Lady Edith 
 Lilly Lubin as Isabel

References

Bibliography
 Kulik, Karol. Alexander Korda: The Man Who Could Work Miracles. Virgin Books, 1990.

External links

1920 films
Austrian silent feature films
Austrian historical adventure films
Films directed by Alexander Korda
Prince and the Pauper 1920
Films set in London
Prince and the Pauper 1920
Films set in the 1540s
1920s historical adventure films
Cultural depictions of Edward VI of England
Australian black-and-white films
Silent historical adventure films
1920s German-language films